James M. Manyika is a Zimbabwean-American academic, consultant, and business executive. He is known for his research and scholarship into the intersection of technology and the economy, including artificial intelligence, robotics automation, and the future of work. He is Google's first Senior Vice President of Technology and Society, reporting directly to Google CEO Sundar Pichai. He focuses on "shaping and sharing" the company's view on the way tech affects society, the economy, and the planet. He is also Chairman Emeritus of the McKinsey Global Institute.

Previously, he was director and chairman of the McKinsey Global Institute, where he researched and co-authored a number of reports on topics such as technology, the future of work and workplace automation, and other global economy trends. During the Obama administration, Manyika served as vice-chair of the United States Global Development Council at the White House.

As a board-member, trustee, or advisor, Manyika is involved with think tanks, national and international commissions, academic institutions, and non-profit and philanthropic foundations including the Council on Foreign Relations, the MacArthur Foundation, the Hewlett Foundation, Stanford's Human-Centered AI Institute, the Oxford Internet Institute, and the Aspen Institute. He is a fellow at DeepMind. He is also a Visiting Professor at Oxford University's Blavatnik School of Government.

Early life and education 
Born and raised in Zimbabwe, James Manyika attended Prince Edward School and received a Bachelor of Science in Electrical Engineering at the University of Zimbabwe. He attended Oxford University as a Rhodes Scholar, earning a Master of Science in mathematics and computer science, a Master of Arts, and a Doctor of Philosophy in AI and Robotics.

Career 
Trained as a roboticist, while at Oxford Manyika studied computer science, artificial intelligence (AI), robotics, and topics such as Bayesian networks  and decentralized data fusion. He and Hugh F. Durrant-Whyte published the book Decentralized Data Fusion: An Information Theoretic Approach in 1994. Early in his career, Manyika was awarded a research fellowship at Oxford's Balliol College and served on the engineering faculty at Oxford. During that time he was also a faculty exchange fellow at the Massachusetts Institute of Technology and a visiting scientist at NASA Jet Propulsion Labs in California.

He joined McKinsey & Company in the United States by 1997, then became senior partner and a member of McKinsey’s board. He was chairman and director of the McKinsey Global Institute for 13 years.

In 2022, he became Google’s first Senior Vice President of Technology and Society, reporting to CEO Sundar Pichai, where he helps shape Google's views on issues such as AI, the future of work, the digital economy, computing infrastructure and sustainability, focusing on how all of these benefit and affect societies, their economies and the planet as a whole.

In 2011, he was named to the US National Innovation Advisory Board at the Department of Commerce. During the Obama administration, from December 2012 until 2017, Manyika served as vice-chair of the United States Global Development Council at the White House. In 2017, he resigned from the Commerce Department's Digital Economy Board of Advisors after Donald Trump made controversial comments about deadly violence against counter-protestors in Charlottesville, Virginia. In 2022, Manyika was appointed as the vice-chair of the National Artificial Intelligence Advisory Committee, advising the US President and the National AI Initiative Office on a "range of issues related to artificial intelligence". Also in 2022, he was appointed by the US Secretary of State to the Foreign Affairs Policy Board.

In August 2019, California Governor Gavin Newsom appointed Manyika and Mary Kay Henry as co-chairs of the state's Future of Work Commission. In March 2021, he and the Future of Work Commission co-authored a report urging California to better address pay inequality and working conditions by 2030. He also co-chaired, with Admiral William H. McRaven, the Council on Foreign Relations Task Force on U.S. Innovation Strategy and National Security, which issued their final report, Innovation and National Security: Keeping Our Edge in 2019. In 2019, Manyika became a member of the Trilateral Commission, and in 2020 was a member of its Task Force on Global Capitalism in Transition. 

In 2015, he also co-wrote the book No Ordinary Disruption: The Four Global Forces Breaking All the Trends. Manyika was a guest speaker in September 2017 at an Estonian summit involving European Union heads of state. His decision-making process and predictions about the future of work were described in Ben Sasse's 2018 book Them: Why We Hate Each Other--and How to Heal. Manyika contributed one chapter to the 2018 book Architects of Intelligence: The truth about AI from the people building it, by Martin Ford. In 2022, Manyika guest-edited a volume of Daedalus, the journal of the Academy of Arts and Sciences, that was devoted to AI & Society. That volume included his essay "Getting AI Right: Introductory Notes on AI & Society", as well as essays by AI researchers, technologists, and social scientists.

He was named one of the 100 Most Influential Africans of 2020 by New African magazine. In February 2021, he co-authored a McKinsey report titled The Race in the Workplace: The Black Experience. In December 2022, he was again listed by New African as one of the 100 Most Influential Africans of the year.

Boards and academia 

Manyika is involved with a number of think tanks. He is an elected member and on the board of directors of the Council on Foreign Relations, a trustee of the Aspen Institute, and former trustee of the World Affairs Council of California.

He is on the advisory boards of Harvard's Hutchins Center for African and African American Research, which includes the W. E. B. Du Bois Research Institute, and the Broad Institute of MIT and Harvard and is on the advisory council of the Institute for Human-Centered Artificial Intelligence at Stanford University. Concerning digitization, he is also on the advisory boards of the MIT Initiative on the Digital Economy (IDE) and the Oxford Internet Institute, having joined the latter in September 2011. He was an officer of the One Hundred Year Study on Artificial Intelligence, a project at Stanford University where experts discuss the future societal impacts of AI and was on the advisory board of the University of California, Berkeley School of Information. He is a member of the Editorial Board of the Journal of Globalization and Developmentf.

Manyika has served on the National Academies of Science, Engineering and Medicine's Committee on Responsible Computing Research and its Application. He has been elected a fellow of the American Academy of Arts and Sciences, a life fellow of the Royal Society of Arts, a distinguished fellow of Stanford's Institute for Human-Centered AI, a distinguished fellow in ethics and AI at Oxford, a research fellow of DeepMind and a visiting fellow of All Souls College and Balliol College, Oxford.

Foundations and non-profits 

Manyika is a board member of the MacArthur Foundation, as well as the Foundation's Lever For Change project connecting philanthropists to projects with positive social impact. Other foundations where Manyika is a board member include the Hewlett Foundation, and the Markle Foundation. He is a trustee of the XPrize Foundation and a senior advisor at the philanthropic Schmidt Futures. Through the Hutchins Center for African & African American Research, he established the J.M.D. Manyika Fellowship to support scholars and artists from countries in Southern Africa. He is on the board of the Khan Academy, which offers free education online.

Publications
Books
Decentralized Data Fusion: An Information Theoretic Approach (with Hugh F. Durrant-Whyte); Prentice Hall (December 1, 1994)
No Ordinary Disruption: The Four Global Forces Breaking All the Trends (with Jonathan Woetzel, and Richard Dobbs); PublicAffairs (1 January 2015)

Personal life

Manyika is married to the writer Sarah Ladipo Manyika.

See also
Members of the Council on Foreign Relations
List of American Academy of Arts and Sciences members (2006–2019)
List of Rhodes Scholars

References

External links

James Manyika - publication history (reports, papers, books) at Google Scholar

Alumni of the University of Oxford
Google employees
Living people
McKinsey & Company people
Nationality missing
University of Zimbabwe alumni
Year of birth missing (living people)
Zimbabwean people
Zimbabwean engineers